The Sunfeast Open was an annual WTA Tour tennis tournament that was started in Kolkata in 2005. The event was a Tier III-tournament with a prize money of USD 175,000 and was played on indoors greenset. The fourth edition of the  WTA Sunfeast Open, slated to be held in Kolkata from 6–12 October 2008, was shifted to Mumbai as the dates clash with the Durga Puja. The 2008 tournament in Mumbai, was to be held outdoors in the premises of Cricket Club of India, unlike the previous three editions. ITC, an Indian conglomerate based out of Kolkata was the primary sponsor of the event. The company owns the Sunfeast brand of biscuits.

Since 2008, the Sunfeast Open, has no longer been listed on the WTA calendar and hence has been cancelled after running into trouble regarding venues.

Past finals

Singles

Doubles

See also
List of tennis tournaments

 
Tennis tournaments in India
Sport in Kolkata
Indoor tennis tournaments
Hard court tennis tournaments
WTA Tour
ITF Women's World Tennis Tour
Recurring sporting events established in 2005
Recurring sporting events disestablished in 2008
Defunct tennis tournaments in India
Defunct sports competitions in India
2005 establishments in West Bengal
2008 disestablishments in India